Carnetown (or 'Carne') is a district of Abercynon, within the Cynon Valley in the County Borough of Rhondda Cynon Taf, Wales.

Carnetown is located to the south and west of Abercynon, and comprises Carnetown itself to the west, and the large modern housing estate of 'Grovers Field' to the south.

The area is home to 'Carnetown Primary School', 'St. Donat's Church' (built in 1898), 'Carne Park Hotel' and various shops/businesses, and previously had its own post office until 2005.

Gallery

References

Villages in Rhondda Cynon Taf